Hyposmocoma kikokolu is a species of moth of the family Cosmopterigidae. It is endemic to Nihoa. The type locality is Miller Canyon.

The wingspan is 8–10 millimetres (mm).

All adults were reared from case-making larvae. Larvae were collected on the ground. The larval case is cone-shaped and 6.0–8.7 mm in length. It is small and thin and decorated with beige, brown, and black sand grains. The operculum of the case is covered with small pebbles. The background color ranges from gray to grayish brown.

External links
New species of Hyposmocoma (Lepidoptera, Cosmopterigidae) from the remote Northwestern Hawaiian Islands of Laysan, Necker, and Nihoa

K
Endemic moths of Hawaii
Endemic fauna of Nihoa
Moths described in 2009